Rajat Narendra Bedi is an Indo-Canadian actor, who primarily appears in Hindi cinema. He is best known for portraying Raj Saxena in the film Koi... Mil Gaya (2003).

Career
Bedi has worked over 40 films, including Rakht (2004), Khamoshh... Khauff Ki Raat (2005) and Rocky - The Rebel (2006).

Personal life
He is married to Monalisa Bedi (sister of actress Tulip Joshi) and has 2 children.

Filmography
 2023 Gol GappePali
 2016 White
2016 Jaggu DadaDon Subhash Bhai
2012 Jaanleva Black Blood 
2012 Monopoly the Game of Money 
 2008 Lakh Pardesi HoiyeHarry
 2007 PartnerNeil Bakshi
 2007 The TrainSpecial Investigating Officer Asif Ahmed Khan(Special Appearance)
 2007 Life Mein Kabhie KabhieeRohit Kumar
2006 Jaan-E-Mann: Let's Fall in Love... Again - Vishal Goel
2006 Hello? Kaun Hai!-Sanjeev
 2006 Rocky - The RebelAnthony D'Silva 
 2006 AksarChief Investigatiing Officer Steve Bakshi
 2005 Vaah! Life Ho Toh Aisi!Punky (special appearance)
2005 Dhamkee -Vijay Saxena
2005 Fun: Can Be Dangerous Sometimes 
2005 Nishaan: The Target 
 2005 Khamoshh... Khauff Ki RaatVarun
2004 The Hope 
 2004 Gajendra Chotta Babu (Tamil)
 2004 RakhtACP Ranbir Singh
 2004 Woh Tera Naam ThaBasharat Ali
 2003 Koi... Mil GayaRaj Saxena
 2003 Border Hindustan KaHari Singh
 2003 The Hero: Love Story of a SpyMilitant
2003 Chaalbaaz 
 2002 Wah Tera Kya KehnaBrother of Mina (Preeti Jhangiani)
 2002 Ansh: The Deadly PartMunna
 2002 Chor Machaaye ShorTony
 2002 Jaani Dushman: Ek Anokhi KahaniRajesh
 2002 Ab Ke BarasRajbir Singhal
 2002 Maa Tujhhe SalaamCapt. Naseer Khan (guest appearance)
 2002 Yeh Dil AashiqanaaVijay Varma (Pooja's brother)
 2001 IndianSanjay Singhania
 2001 Jodi No.1Tiger (guest appearance)
 1999 International KhiladiAmit
 1998 2001: Do Hazaar EkInspector Rajat

References

External links
 
 

Living people
Male actors in Hindi cinema
Punjabi people
Indian expatriates in Canada
Indian television producers
Male actors in Tamil cinema
1970 births